Benjamin Asare (born 13 July 1992) is a Ghanaian professional footballer who plays as a goalkeeper for Ghanaian Premier League side Accra Great Olympics.

Career

Early career 
Asare previously served as the goalkeeper for the then Sporting Mirren FC which is now Accra City Stars FC before joining Accra Great Olympics.

Great Olympics 
In 2020, ahead of the 2020–21 Ghana Premier League, he moved to Accra Great Olympics and was named on the club's squad list for the season. On 15 November 2020, he made his debut, starting in the first match of the season in a 1–1 draw against Medeama SC. On 20 November 2020, match day 2, he kept a clean sheet in a 3–0 victory against Legon Cities FC. Subsequently, he became second goalkeeper to Saed Salifu and played less matches within the first round of the season.

References

External links 

 

Living people
1992 births
Association football goalkeepers
Ghanaian footballers
Accra Great Olympics F.C. players
Ghana Premier League players
Sporting Saint Mirren F.C. players
20th-century Ghanaian people
21st-century Ghanaian people